Castlebar Hill is a hill in Ealing which is  high.  In the 18th century, it was the location of Castle Beare, a grand mansion or country seat, for the area at this time was but a hamlet, not yet having been built up as part of the London conurbation.

Castlebar Hill is also the name of one of the roads that runs up the hill (now classed as part of the B455).

An experimental hostel for deaf and blind children was founded at what is now 8 Castlebar Hill by Dr Edith Whetnall FRCS, a pioneering audiologist. The hostel was opened in 1953 by Iain Macleod MP and Spencer Tracy, as part of The Royal National Throat, Nose and Ear Hospital. It closed in 1993. In 2015, the Ealing Civil Society unveiled a plaque dedicated to the work of Dr Edith Whetnall on the building.

Notable residents
 Archibald Constable, publisher.
 Lord Heathfield of Gibraltar
 Lt. General Frederick Wetherall, who conquered Java during the Napoleonic Wars.
 Prince Edward, Duke of Kent, father of Queen Victoria.
 Squire George Osbaldeston, outstanding sportsman and gambler.

References

Districts of the London Borough of Ealing
Hills of London
Streets in the London Borough of Ealing